Andrea Guardini (born 12 June 1989) is an Italian former professional cyclist, who rode professionally between 2011 and 2021 for the , , ,  and  teams.

A sprinter, Guardini currently holds the record for most stage wins at the Tour de Langkawi with twenty-four stage victories; recording five at the 2011 race, six in 2012, one in 2013, two in 2014 and 2018, and four in 2015 and 2016. With 43 career wins, the majority of his victories came in the Tour de Langkawi.

Major results

2007
 4th Road race, UEC European Junior Road Championships
2009
 3rd  Road race, Mediterranean Games
 3rd Circuito del Porto
2010
 1st Stage 3 Girobio
2011
 Tour de Langkawi
1st  Points classification
1st Stages 1, 2, 6, 7 & 10
 Tour of Turkey
1st Stages 1 & 7
 1st Stage 5 Tour of Qatar
 1st Stage 5 Volta a Portugal
 1st Stage 3 Tour of Slovenia
 1st Stage 5 Giro di Padania
2012
 1st Stage 18 Giro d'Italia
 Tour de Langkawi
1st  Points classification
1st Stages 2, 3, 4, 8, 9 & 10
 Tour of Qinghai Lake
1st Stages 9, 10 & 12
 3rd Grand Prix de Denain
2013
 1st Stage 7 Tour de Langkawi
 4th Scheldeprijs
2014
 Tour de Langkawi
1st Stages 3 & 10
 Danmark Rundt
1st Stages 2 & 4
 1st Stage 1 Eneco Tour
 8th Scheldeprijs
2015
 Tour of Oman
1st  Points classification
1st Stage 1
 Tour de Langkawi
1st Stages 1, 2, 4 & 8
 1st Stage 1 Abu Dhabi Tour
 1st Stage 1 World Ports Classic
 2nd Overall Tour de Picardie
1st Stage 2
2016
 Tour de Langkawi
1st  Points classification
1st Stages 1, 5, 7 & 8
 9th Overall Tour de Picardie
2018
 Tour de Langkawi
1st  Points classification
1st Stages 1 & 8
 1st Stage 4 Tour of Hainan
 8th Giro del Piemonte
2019
 1st Stage 3 Istrian Spring Trophy
 1st Stage 10 Tour of Qinghai Lake
 2nd Trofej Umag
2020
 Tour of Romania
1st Stages 1 & 5
2021
 3rd Overall Tour of Szeklerland
1st Stages 1 & 3
 4th Grand Prix Gazipaşa
 4th GP Manavgat

Grand Tour general classification results timeline

References

External links

Italian male cyclists
Living people
1989 births
Italian Giro d'Italia stage winners
Presidential Cycling Tour of Turkey stage winners
Cyclists from the Province of Verona
Mediterranean Games bronze medalists for Italy
Mediterranean Games medalists in cycling
Competitors at the 2009 Mediterranean Games